Anatoly Antonovich Volin (July 22, 1903, Temryuk, Kuban Oblast – August 2007, Moscow, Russia) was a Soviet statesman and lawyer who served as chairman of the Supreme Court of the Soviet Union (1948–1957).

Biography
Born into a large family of fishermen, he was the son and ninth child of Anton Prokhorovich Volin and Irina Ivanovna (née Ganycheva).

From 1920 to 1921, he worked at a fish factory in the city of Temryuk. Since 1921 – chief of the secret part of the headquarters of one of the units of the Workers' and Peasants' Red Army. Member of the Civil War. In 1923–1926, he was a student of the workers' faculty in Krasnodar. Member of the Russian Communist Party (Bolsheviks) since October 1925.

Volin graduated from the Law Faculty of the Leningrad State University in 1930. In 1930–1931, he was a post–graduate student at the Communist Academy in Leningrad.

In 1931–1932, he was a teacher and head of a department at Leningrad University, then in 1932, he was transferred to the Autonomous Karelian Socialist Soviet Republic as head of the sector of culture and public education. He headed the department at Petrozavodsk University. In 1933–1935, he was the prosecutor of Petrozavodsk. Since 1935 – assistant to the prosecutor of the Volodarsky District, prosecutor of the Sokolniki District of Leningrad.

From 1937 to 1939 he was Deputy Prosecutor of the Russian Soviet Federative Socialist Republic. From 1939 to 1948 – Prosecutor of the RSFSR.

From August 1948 to February 1957 – Chairman of the Supreme Court of the Soviet Union. At the same time, in 1948–1952, he participated in the purges of the justice authorities and organized and supervised judicial panels for the consideration of crimes committed by judges. He was suspended from office in connection with the explanation of the plenum of the Supreme Court about the possibility of restitution of housing to rehabilitated citizens in January 1954, which was soon recognized as erroneous by the leadership of the Communist Party of the Soviet Union.

1957–1969 – Deputy Chief Arbitrator of the State Arbitration Commission under the Council of Ministers of the Soviet Union. He fought for control over the justice authorities.

Since 1969, he has been a personal pensioner of union significance. For several years he worked as a consultant for the magazine "Man and Law".

Deputy of the Supreme Soviet of the Russian Soviet Federative Socialist Republic of the second convocation.

He was buried at the Vvedenskoye Cemetery (section 7).

Perpetuation of memory
In 2010, a memorial plaque was installed on the building of the Prosecutor's Office of the Republic of Karelia in memory of the work of Anatoly Volin in the Petrozavodsk City Prosecutor's Office.

Sources
100 Years to Anatoly Antonovich Volin // Bulletin of the Supreme Arbitration Court of the Russian Federation – Moscow: YURIT–Bulletin, 2003, No. 7 – Pages 144–146

References

External links
Interview With Volin
Volin's Biography
Photo of Anatoly Volin in Old Age
Grave of Anatoly Volin, His Wife and Son
"Stalin's Prosecutor" (Interview)

1903 births
2007 deaths
People from Kuban Oblast
Communist Party of the Soviet Union members
Members of the Supreme Soviet of the Russian Soviet Federative Socialist Republic
Men centenarians
Saint Petersburg State University alumni
Recipients of the Order of Lenin
Recipients of the Order of the Red Banner of Labour
Russian centenarians
Russian jurists
Soviet jurists
Burials at Vvedenskoye Cemetery